Denys Sydorenko (born 18 April 1989) is a professional Ukrainian football goalkeeper who plays for Metalist 1925 Kharkiv in the Ukrainian First League.

Career 
He attended the Metalist Youth School system, from July 2008 to January 2009 and played 11 Games in the Perscha Liga for FC Dniester Ovidiopol on loan from Metalist.

External links 
 
 
Profile on Sport UPC

1989 births
Living people
Ukrainian footballers
FC Metalist Kharkiv players
FC Dnister Ovidiopol players
FC Helios Kharkiv players
FC Metalist 1925 Kharkiv players
Association football goalkeepers
Footballers from Kharkiv
Ukrainian Premier League players
Ukrainian First League players